Graphicomassa ligula is a species of sea snail, a marine gastropod mollusk in the family Columbellidae, the dove snails.

Description
The shell size varies between 11 mm and 25 mm

Distribution
This species occurs in the Indian Ocean off Aldabra and Réunion and in the Indo-West Pacific and off New Zealand

References

 Duclos P.L. 1840. Histoire naturelle générale et particulière de tous les genres de coquilles univalves marines à l'état vivant et fossile publiée par monographie. Genre Columbella, 1 p., 13 pls. Didot, Paris
 Taylor, J.D. (1973). Provisional list of the mollusca of Aldabra Atoll

External links
 

Columbellidae
Gastropods described in 1835